Northwood High School is a public high school located in Saltville, Virginia.  The school serves about 300 students in grades 9 to 12 in the Smyth County Public Schools system.  The school operates on a 4x4 block schedule and has many goals in place to improve the achievement of students on Virginia Standards of Learning exams.

The school opened in 1957 as R. B. Worthy High School. In 1987, Northwood High School was formed when R. B. Worthy and Rich Valley High Schools were consolidated due to declining enrollment. The school is fed by Northwood Middle School, which, in turn, is fed by Saltville Elementary School and Rich Valley Elementary School.

Northwood's mascot is the black panther, and they are known as The Panthers.

Athletics
Northwood High School has a number of athletics:

Football
Volleyball
Cheerleading
Boys and Girls Basketball
Baseball
Softball
Track
Golf
Wrestling

State Championships
Volleyball 1998 and 
Girls Basketball 2016

Academics
Northwood is a member of the Southwest Academic Conference.

Championships:
English - 2004, 2006
Social Studies - 2003, 2004, 2005, 2006
All-Around - 2006

Arts
Band

The band is known as the Panther Pride Marching band and consists of about 20 members as of 2019. It is under the direction of Erica Johnson.

The band has won numerous awards in 2018 including 1st Places in Percussion, Colorguard, and Drum Major. The band also received an "Excellent Rating" at the 2018 VBDOA State Marching Assessment.

The Band's 2019 show is entitled "The Greatest Show" with music from the film "The Greatest Showman".

Art

Northwood High School offers Art I-V (1-5) and is taught by Tammy Carter.

Theatre

In 2016 Northwood High School placed 1st in the Crooked Road Conference with a play titled "Look Me in the Eye" by Lindsay Price. The class is taught by David Burns.

References

External links 
Northwood High School website

Educational institutions established in 1987
Public high schools in Virginia
Schools in Smyth County, Virginia
1987 establishments in Virginia